Alan Joseph Patterson (born 19 January 1941) is a former field hockey player from New Zealand, who represented his native country at three Summer Olympics: in 1960, 1964 and 1972.

References

External links
 
 

1941 births
Living people
New Zealand male field hockey players
Olympic field hockey players of New Zealand
Field hockey players at the 1964 Summer Olympics
Field hockey players at the 1968 Summer Olympics
Field hockey players at the 1972 Summer Olympics
Field hockey players from Christchurch